Manali Kishor Dakshini (born 29 September 1997) is a Maharashtrian cricketer. She is a right arm medium pacer and right hand bat. She plays for Mumbai and West Zone. She has played 3 First-class matches, 11 Limited over matches and 21 Women's Twenty20. In January 2019, she was named in India Blue's team for the 2018–19 Senior Women's Challenger Trophy. She was one of the top performers of challengers trophy held in jan 2019 with remarkable all round  performance. Manali was selected in the Velocity squad for 2020 Women's T20 Challenge.

References 

1997 births
Living people
Mumbai women cricketers
West Zone women cricketers
People from Thane
IPL Velocity cricketers